Panorama was a German quarterly colour newsreel series that focused on "human interest" stories in 1944. It only lasted for that year, since the Third Reich fell in early 1945, before another installment could be produced. The four reels that were made are a source for colour images of the Germany and occupied Europe in the last full year of Nazi domination.

Panorama supposedly focused on "human interest" stories in 1944, such as harvesting, but also on army training.

See also 
List of German films 1933–1945

Films of Nazi Germany
1944 films
Nazi propaganda films
German short documentary films
Newsreels
German black-and-white films
1944 documentary films
1940s German films